Rathangan GAA Club is a Gaelic football club based in Rathangan, County Kildare, Ireland.  In more recent times, Rathangan GAA have been selected to play in the very successful RTÉ production Celebrity Bainisteoir. They were managed by Today FM DJ Ray D'Arcy.

Achievements
 Kildare Senior Football Championship: (1) 1925
 Leinster Leader Cup 1922, 1925
 Kildare Intermediate Football League 1969
 Kildare Intermediate Football Championship: 1941, 1981, 1993, 2001 
 Kildare Junior A Football Championship 1970
 Kildare Senior Football League Division 1: 2006
U.20 Division 3 league 2022
U. 23 Championship 2023

Declan Brennan , Bobby o loughlin

References

Gaelic games clubs in County Kildare
Gaelic football clubs in County Kildare